The Pes is a river in Khvoyninsky District of Novgorod Oblast and in Chagodoshchensky District of Vologda Oblast in Russia. It is a right tributary of the Chagodoshcha. The principal tributary of the Pes is the Rattsa (left). The urban-type settlements of Khvoynaya and Sazonovo are located on the banks of the Pes.

The source of the Pes is Lake Rakitinskoye in the west of Khvoyninsky District. The Medveda is the principal tributary of Lake Rakitinskoye. The Pes flows in the eastern direction, passes the settlement of Khvoynaya, accepts the Kushavera from the right, enters Vologda Oblast, and turns northeast. In the settlement of Sazonovo, it accepts the Rattsa from the left. The mouth of the Pes is close to the urban-type settlement of Chagoda.

The river basin of the Pes comprises the major part (western and central) of Khvoyninsky District, some areas in the east of Lyubytinsky District of Novgorod Oblast, and the southwest of Chagodoshchensky district. In particular, it includes many lakes located in the southwest of Khvoyninsky District.

Until the 1990s, the Pes was used for timber rafting.

References

Rivers of Vologda Oblast
Rivers of Novgorod Oblast